TJ may refer to:

Fictional characters
 T.J. Detweiler, the protagonist of Recess
 T.J. Hammond, a character in the miniseries Political Animals
 T. J. Hooker, an American television show and title character
 TJ Wagner, a comic book character known as Nocturne
 Tamara Johansen, a character in the television series Stargate Universe
 Theodore Jay Jarvis Johnson, a fictional character from the TV series Power Rangers Turbo and Power Rangers in Space
 TJ Kippen, a recurring character on the Disney Channel series Andi Mack

People
 T. J. (given name), shared by several people
 Thomas Jefferson, third president of the United States
 Teddyson John, Saint Lucian brand ambassador, singer and songwriter

Places
 Tajikistan (ISO 3166-1 country code TJ)
 Tianjin, China (Guobiao abbreviation TJ)
 Tijuana, Mexico
 Torrejón de Ardoz, Spain

Businesses and organizations

Schools
 Temasek Junior College in eastern Singapore
 Thomas Jefferson High School for Science and Technology
 Tongji University in Shanghai, China

Transport
 Thanjavur Junction railway station in Tamil Nadu, India (Indian Railways station code)
TransJakarta in Jakarta, Indonesia
 Trans Jogja in Yogyakarta, Indonesia

Other businesses and organizations
 T.J.'s, a nightclub and live music venue in Newport, Wales
 Trader Joe's, a chain of specialty grocery stores

Law
 Therapeutic jurisprudence, the study of the effect that legal rules and procedures produce on individuals involved in legal processes
 Tribunal de Justiça, or Court of Justice, the appellate courts of Brazil

Science and technology
 .tj, the country code top level domain (ccTLD) for Tajikistan
 Terajoule, a unit of energy equal to 1012 joules
 Thermal Junction, or Junction temperature, in semiconductors
 Tommy John surgery, a surgical procedure named after a former Major League Baseball pitcher

Other uses
 Tj (digraph)
 TJ, aka Creation Ex Nihilo Technical Journal, published by Creation Ministries International
 Tamgha-i-Jurat, the fourth highest military award of Pakistan
 Jeep TJ, the Canadian name for the 1997-2006 Jeep Wrangler, an off-road vehicle
 Tajikistani somoni (Symbol TJS), the currency of Tajikistan
 A Theory of Justice, a book by John Rawls
 toimitusjohtaja, the Finnish equivalent to CEO
 Triple jump, a discipline in athletics
 Turbojugend, the international fan club of the Norwegian rock band Turbonegro

See also
 Tee Jay (1962–2006), Ghanaian British boxer
 Tejay (disambiguation)
 Tjay (disambiguation)
 TJ Maxx

Nicknames